Adnan Yaakob (Jawi: عدنان بن حاج يعقوب; born 18 April 1950) is a Malaysian politician who served as the 14th Menteri Besar of Pahang from 25 May 1999 to 15 May 2018. He is a member of the United Malays National Organisation (UMNO).

Biography
Born (in 1950) and raised in Bentong, Pahang, Adnan Yaakob graduated from secondary school and became a teacher in 1969. He then attended the University of Malaya from 1972 and graduated in 1975. He studied for his Diploma of Education until 1977 before enrolling at the International Islamic University Malaysia to study law.

Adnan never completed his law studies, having dropped out to join full-time politics. He contested and won the Pahang State Legislative Assembly seat in Pelangai during the 1986 general election. He was elected UMNO division chief in Bentong in 1987.

In 1999, Adnan was appointed Menteri Besar of Pahang, succeeding Mohd Khalil Yaakob.

In the aftermath of the 2018 election, he was succeeded by Wan Rosdy Wan Ismail as Menteri Besar. At 19 years of service, Adnan Yaakob is the longest-serving Menteri Besar of Pahang to date.

Personal life
Adnan is married to Junaini Kassim and the couple have four children.

Controversy 
Adnan Yaakob once made an obscene gesture (by hitting his clenched left fist on his right palm) towards Malaysian Islamic Party (Pas) supporters during the nomination in Sanggang by-election in 21 March 2000, which caused him to be nicknamed "Samseng" by Pas members. A police report was made by Pahang Keadilan youth two days later. Later in 21 April 2006, he swear the word "go to hell" and "Pergi Jahanam" in the Pahang State Assembly as he made a mistake on his report.

Honours
 :
  Commander of the Order of Loyalty to the Crown of Malaysia (PSM) – Tan Sri (2022)
  :
  Knight Companion of the Order of Sultan Ahmad Shah of Pahang (DSAP) – Dato' (1992)
  Grand Knight of the Order of Sultan Ahmad Shah of Pahang (SSAP) – Dato' Sri (1999)
  Grand Royal Knight of the Grand Royal Order of Sultan Ahmad Shah of Pahang (SDSA) – Dato' Sri Diraja (2010)
  :
  Grand Commander of the Order of Malacca (DGSM) – Datuk Seri (2004)

Election Results

References

Footnotes

Sources
 

1950 births
Chief Ministers of Pahang
Living people
Malaysian people of Malay descent
Malaysian Muslims
People from Pahang
United Malays National Organisation politicians
University of Malaya alumni
International Islamic University Malaysia alumni
Members of the Pahang State Legislative Assembly
Pahang state executive councillors
Commanders of the Order of Loyalty to the Crown of Malaysia